On 5 August 1983 at 3:30 am, gunmen entered a luxury Sofitel hotel in Avignon, France. They killed seven people there in a mass shooting which has been referred to as the Sofitel massacre. Four of those killed were employees and three were customers.

Police believed the gunmen were three robbers who attempted to break into the hotel's safe deposit boxes, and that they killed the victims to eliminate any witnesses. The robbers also took some staff members hostage, apparently to search for a master key of the boxes. The French government was criticised by hotel and restaurant unions as well as the police, demanding tougher action against crime. In addition, it happened after the government abolished the death penalty for murder and in another move made it easier for long-term prisoners to win parole.

Jean Roussel, a 38-year-old robber, was arrested soon after whilst the other suspects escaped. Roussel barely spoke amid the investigation and he died from a heart attack in 1985. In June 1987, François Arpinot, a scrap dealer, and Gérard Rolland, a nightclub bouncer, were sentenced to 18 and 15 years in prison, respectively. It was implied that Roussel launched the robbery to finance his escape, as he was already detained in another case but granted leave.

See also
Marseille bar massacre
Monbar Hotel attack

References

1983 murders in France
1983 mass shootings in Europe
Massacres in 1983
20th-century mass murder in France
Attacks on buildings and structures in France
Attacks on hotels in Europe
August 1983 crimes
August 1983 events in Europe
Avignon
Deaths by firearm in France
Mass shootings in France
Massacres in France
Murder in Provence-Alpes-Cote d'Azur
Organized crime events in France